Bigfoot is an alleged human-like creature of North American folklore.

Bigfoot or Big Foot may also refer to:

Film and TV
 Bigfoot (1970 film), a feature film
 Bigfoot (2009 film), a comedy film
 Bigfoot (2012 film), a made-for-television film
 Bigfoot Superstar, a 2020 animated sequel film to 2018's "The Son of Bigfoot"
 Bigfoot, an animated series television pilot
 "Big Foot" (The Goodies), a 1982 episode of The Goodies
 Harry and the Hendersons, titled Bigfoot and the Hendersons in the UK, a 1987 American comedy film directed and produced by William Dear

Motorsports
Bigfoot (truck), a famous monster truck

Music
 Shanks & Bigfoot, a British songwriting/production duo
 Bigfoot, an album by Cayucas (2013)

Songs
 "Big Foot" (Charlie Parker composition), a 1948 jazz standard
 "Big Foot" (Nico Touches the Walls song), 2009
 "Bigfoot", a 2014 single by the Dutch disc-jockeys group W&W
 "Big Foot", a 1967 single by Dick Curless
 "Big Foot", a song by P-Model from the 1993 album Big Body
 "Big Foot", a song by Chickenfoot from the 2001 album Chickenfoot III
 "Big Foot", a song by New Grass Revival from the 1989 album Friday Night in America
 "Bigfoot", a song by Béla Fleck and the Flecktones from the 1996 album Live Art
 "Bigfoot", a song by Math the Band from 2009 album Don't Worry

People
 Jerome Brailey (born 1950), drummer also known as Bigfoot
 Mamongazeda ("Big Foot"), an Ojibwa chief
 Andrew Martin (1975–2009), professional wrestler, stage name, due to his "big boot" finishing move
 Matthew McGrory (1973–2005), American actor and Howard Stern Show regular, also known as Bigfoot
 Mitchell Schwartz (born 1989), National Football League offensive tackle with a size 18 shoe
 Antônio Silva (fighter) (born 1979), MMA fighter
 Spotted Elk (1826–1890), Lakota Sioux chief later also known as Big Foot
 William A. A. Wallace (1817–1899), Texas Ranger also known as Bigfoot

Places

United States
 Bigfoot, Texas, a town 
 Big Foot Prairie, Illinois and Wisconsin, an unincorporated community
 Big Foot High School, Wisconsin
 Big Foot Airfield, Wisconsin

Companies
 Bigfoot Biomedical, a Type 1 Diabetes medical technology company
 Bigfoot Entertainment, a movie production company
 Bigfoot International, a dot-com era holding company
 Bigfoot 4×4, Inc, the company that owns and operates Bigfoot (truck)

Other
 Bigfoot (hard drive), a computer storage product
 Bigfoot (video game), a 1990 video game by Acclaim for Nintendo Entertainment System
 Bigfoot: Collision Course, a 2008 video game by Zoo Games
 A nickname for the first Narco-submarine seized by United States Coast Guard
Bigfoot, a member of S.H.A.D.E. from DC Comics